The 1976 World Championships in Athletics was the first global, international athletics competition organised by the International Association of Athletics Federations (IAAF). Hosted on 18 September 1976 in Malmö, Sweden, it featured just one event: a men's 50 kilometres race walk contest. The course passed through the streets of the city and the start and finish points were within Malmö Stadion.

Summary
Soviet athlete Veniamin Soldatenko (runner-up at the 1972 Olympics) was the gold medallist. This made him the first ever IAAF world champion and at 37 years and 258 days he remains the oldest male athlete to win that accolade. Mexico's Enrique Vera came second and Finnish walker Reima Salonen was third. A total of 42 walkers representing 20 countries entered the championships race and 37 finished, with four failed to finish and one being disqualified.

The International Olympic Committee decided to drop the men's 50 km walk from the Olympic athletics programme for the 1976 Montreal Olympics, despite its constant presence at the games since 1932. The IAAF chose to host its own world championship event instead, a month and a half after the Olympics.

It was the first World Championships that the IAAF had hosted separate from the Olympic Games (traditionally the main championship for the sport). This marked the beginning of a move away from this arrangement as a 1976 IAAF Council meeting decided that the organisation would host its own, full-programme, championships on a quadrennial basis. The two-race 1980 World Championships in Athletics filled in for the lack of a women's 400 metres hurdles and 3000 metres run at the 1980 Moscow Olympics. The competition came of age at the 41-event 1983 World Championships in Athletics, which is considered the first edition proper.

Records

Results

Participation

 (3)
 (3)
 (3)
 (2)
 (2)
 (3)
 (1)
 (1)
 (3)
 (1)
 (2)
 (1)
 (2)
 (3)
 (1)
 (3)
 (1)
 (3)
 (1)
 (3)

References

Results
IAAF Statistics Book Moscow 2013 (pg. 179). IAAF/AFTS (2013). Edited by Mark Butler. Retrieved on 2013-09-09.

External links
Official IAAF website

World Athletics Championships
World Championships
International athletics competitions hosted by Sweden
International sports competitions in Malmö
World Championships in Athletics
Men's athletics competitions
1970s in Malmö